The Grays Harbor Loggers was the primary name of the minor league baseball team that represented the communities of Grays Harbor, Washington, Hoquiam, Washington and Aberdeen, Washington. Grays Harbor played as members of the Class A Short Season Northwest League from 1976 to 1980.

History

Owned and managed by the Stockton Ports' former owner and manager Carl W. Thompson, Sr., the team had a record of 26-46, at that time the worst in the league.  Season attendance at Hoquiam's Olympic Stadium was fourth in the seven-team Northwest League at 28,842.  The Ports' All-Star pitcher Barry Biggerstaff (9-7, 3.44) led the league in almost every counting category with 17 starts, 15 complete games, 3 shutouts (having tied for the lead), 144 innings, 138 hits, 77 runs, 55 earned runs and 123 strikeouts.  While playing for the Ports, Biggerstaff was only one behind the lead in wins and two behind the league leader in losses.

After Thompson sold the team in 1977, the Ports became the Grays Harbor Loggers.  In 1978 the team took on famed actor Bill Murray for a successful marketing stunt. During the summer of 1978 Murray joined the Loggers for one day. The cast of Saturday Night Live was asked to find something they've always wanted to do and for Murray it was to play professional baseball. Murray joined the independent team in Hoquiam, WA where he knocked in a couple of runs (going 1 for 2, with a single) during his one-day stint. Two years later, the team changed their name to the Grays Harbor Mets, playing as an affiliate of the New York Mets. In 1980, the franchise was once again the Grays Harbor Loggers for the team's season.

Ballpark
The Loggers and the Ports played at Olympic Stadium, located at 101 28th Street, Hoquiam, Washington and Pioneer Park in Aberdeen. The facility is still in use today.

Notable alumni
Actor Bill Murray played for the Grays Harbor for one day in the 1978 season.

 Bill Murray (1978)
 Jose Oquendo (1979)
 Tommy Jones (1976)
 Mark Parent (1980)
 Luis Quiñones (1980)

References

Defunct Northwest League teams
Grays Harbor Loggers players
Grays Harbor Ports players
Defunct minor league baseball teams
Professional baseball teams in Washington (state)
Defunct baseball teams in Washington (state)
Baseball teams disestablished in 1980
Baseball teams established in 1970